Fixin' to Die is the third solo studio album (and ninth overall studio album, including all G. Love and Special Sauce material) by G. Love, released on February 22, 2011 on Brushfire Records.

Track listing
"Fixin' to Die" – 3:28 (Bukka White)
"The Road" – 2:45 (Dutton)
"Katie Miss" - 2:22 (Scott Avett, Dutton)
"Milk and Sugar" - 3:18 (Dutton)
"50 Ways to Leave Your Lover" - 4:22 (Paul Simon)
"You've Got to Die" - 3:38 (Blind Willie McTell)
"Walk On" - 3:43 (Dutton)
"Just Fine" - 4:33 (Cisco Adler, Dutton)
"Ma mère" - 3:54 (Dutton)
"Get Goin'" - 3:10 (Dutton)
"Heaven" - 2:58 (Dutton)
"Home" - 3:40 (Dutton)
"Pale Blue Eyes" - 6:07 (Lou Reed)

iTunes Version includes bonus track:

14. "500 Mile Girl" - 4:38

External links
G. Love & Special Sauce Official site

2011 albums
G. Love & Special Sauce albums